Png Eng Huat (born 9 December 1961) is a Singaporean politician and businessman. A member of the opposition Worker's Party (WP), he was the Member of Parliament for Hougang SMC between 2012 and 2020.

Although he stepped down as an MP for Hougang SMC prior to the 2020 general election, he still remains active in politics.

Career
After completing his university studies, Png worked for various organisations including Philips Singapore and NTUC Income, before setting up some of his own businesses.

Political career
Png joined the Workers' Party in 2006.  

At the 2011 general election, Png stood in a  five-member Worker's Party team in the East Coast GRC. The Party was defeated by the governing People's Action Party (PAP) by 49,429 votes (45.2%) to 59,992 (54.8%). This was third-highest percentage of the votes garnered by losing opposition candidates, which therefore entitled the Workers' Party to nominate a member of the team to become a Non-constituency Member of Parliament (the party nominated Png's teammate Gerald Giam).

On 10 May 2012, the Workers' Party announced that Png would be the party's candidate in the 2012 Hougang by-election. His nomination was confirmed on 16 May. He was one of two candidates in the by-election, the other being Desmond Choo of the PAP. Png won the by-election by 13,460 votes (62.1%) to 8,223 (37.9%).

Following his election to Parliament, the Workers' Party appointed Png as a Vice-Chairman of the Aljunied–Hougang Town Council.

On 25 June 2020, it was announced that Png, along with fellow party members, Low Thia Khiang and Chen Show Mao, would not be contesting in the 2020 general election, but would still remain active in politics. 

Png was re-elected to the WP's CEC despite not contesting in the 2020 Singaporean general election.

Early life and education
Png grew up living in the Tanjong Pagar area of Singapore. He was educated at Peck Seah Primary School and Raffles Institution, before going on to the Singapore Polytechnic, where he completed a Diploma in Electrical engineering in 1983. He then studied radio, television and film at the University of Texas at Austin in the United States, where he earned a Bachelor of Science degree in 1989.

Personal life
Png is married and has one son and one daughter.

See also
List of Singapore opposition party MPs elected

References

External links
 Png Eng Huat at parliament.gov.sg

1961 births
Living people
Workers' Party (Singapore) politicians
Members of the Parliament of Singapore
Moody College of Communication alumni
Singapore Polytechnic alumni
Raffles Institution alumni
Singaporean people of Hokkien descent